Philobdella is a genus of Nearctic leeches belonging to the family Macrobdellidae.

Species 
ITIS includes the following:
 Philobdella floridana  (Verrill, 1874)
 Philobdella gracilis Moore, 1901

References

External links

Annelid genera
Leeches